Stefan Edberg and Petr Korda were the defending champions, but lost in the first round to Gary Muller and Danie Visser.

Nicklas Kulti and Magnus Larsson won the title by defeating Yevgeny Kafelnikov and Daniel Vacek 3–6, 7–6, 6–4 in the final.

Seeds

Draw

Finals

Top half

Bottom half

References

External links
 Official results archive (ATP)
 Official results archive (ITF)

Doubles